The 1981 FIA Formula One World Championship was the 35th season of FIA Formula One motor racing. It featured the 1981 Formula One World Championship for Drivers and the 1981 Formula One World Championship for Constructors, which were contested concurrently over a fifteen-race series that commenced on 15 March and ended on 17 October. Formula One cars also competed in the 1981 South African Grand Prix, although this was a Formula Libre race and was not part of the Formula One World Championship.

The 1981 championship was the first to be run under the FIA Formula One World Championship name, replacing both the original World Championship of Drivers and International Cup for Constructors. Teams were now required to lodge entries for the entire championship rather than individual races, and a standardised set of rules would be in place at every championship race, while the FIA would also set the prize money for all races. After this season, the FIA required that Formula One entrants own the intellectual rights to the chassis that they enter, and so the distinction between the terms "entrant" and "constructor", and hence also "team", have become less pronounced.

Nelson Piquet won the Drivers' Championship, claiming the first of his three drivers' titles, while Williams won the Constructors' Championship for the second consecutive year.

Drivers and constructors
The following teams and drivers contested the 1981 FIA Formula One World Championship:

Calendar
The championship was contested over the following fifteen races:

The following races were included on the original calendar but were cancelled:

Calendar changes
The South African Grand Prix at Kyalami on 7 February was originally on the calendar, but difficulties from the ongoing FISA–FOCA war led to the event being run as a non-championship race, and it was contested only by the Ford-Cosworth powered teams all running cars that had aerodynamic devices which were banned for the 1981 championship season.

The Brazilian Grand Prix was moved from Autodromo de Interlagos in São Paulo to Jacarepaguá (which was resurfaced after cancellation in 1980) in Rio de Janeiro for 1981, due to a long list of safety issues. The race was originally supposed to be held at a resurfaced and revamped Interlagos for 1981, but this did not happen. The race date was moved from January to March.

The Argentine Grand Prix was moved from January to April.

The San Marino Grand Prix was run for the first time in 1981. The race was held at Autodromo Internazionale Enzo e Dino Ferrari on 3 May.

The French Grand Prix was moved from Paul Ricard Circuit to Dijon-Prenois, in keeping with the event-sharing arrangement between the two circuits.

The British Grand Prix was moved from Brands Hatch to Silverstone, in keeping with the event-sharing arrangement between the two circuits.

The Italian Grand Prix was moved from the Autodromo Internazionale Enzo e Dino Ferrari to the Autodromo Nazionale di Monza for 1981, Monza couldn't host the Italian Grand Prix in 1980 because of major upgrades, including building a new pit complex which could not be done in time for 1980. It was done in time for 1981.

The United States Grand Prix was originally scheduled for 4 October, but was cancelled due to the financial difficulties Watkins Glen International was having.

The Caesars Palace Grand Prix made its début on the world championship schedule and was held in the Caesars Palace car park.

Season review

Pre-season
The 1981 Formula One season was a noteworthy season of Grand Prix racing for many reasons: it was effectively the first season that Brabham team owner Bernie Ecclestone and FOCA had the Concorde Agreement in place, which would set Formula One on a course to become a profitable business, thanks to the growing professional involvement of outside companies and professional sponsorship.

There had been a lot of change over the winter. McLaren had lost Alain Prost to Renault, despite a two-year contract, and so John Watson was partnered by Andrea de Cesaris. The team was in the process of being taken over by Ron Dennis's Project 4 and one of the new all-carbonfibre cars appeared in practice. Jean-Pierre Jabouille was still not recovered from his leg injuries from Canada the previous autumn and so Jean-Pierre Jarier was called in to be Jacques Laffite's teammate at the Ligier team (now officially called Talbot Ligier and using Matra V12 engines again). Tyrrell had lost both of its 1980 drivers with Derek Daly moving to March and so hired Eddie Cheever and Kevin Cogan. The team was without sponsorship again.

Ferrari had replaced the retired Jody Scheckter with Didier Pironi and the team had the new turbocharged 126CK. Team Lotus had lost Mario Andretti to Alfa Romeo and so had hired Nigel Mansell to partner Elio de Angelis and were intending to debut the controversial twin-chassis Lotus 88. Team Ensign struggled on with Marc Surer driving while Emerson Fittipaldi had finally decided to retire as a driver and was replaced by Chico Serra to partner Keke Rosberg at Fittipaldi. Arrows had new sponsorship from Ceramiche Ragno and Beta and was running Riccardo Patrese and newcomer Siegfried Stohr while Osella expanded to two cars for Miguel Angel Guerra and Beppe Gabbiani. ATS continued with one car for Jan Lammers, while Theodore Racing had produced a new chassis for Patrick Tambay and RAM had gone into business with March Engineering and was running two March 811s for Daly and Eliseo Salazar.

Non-championship race: South Africa
The South African Grand Prix, held on 7 February at the Kyalami Circuit near Johannesburg, was originally supposed to be the first round of the 1981 Formula One World Championship – but it was eventually stripped of its championship status. The ongoing FISA–FOCA war resulted in Fédération Internationale du Sport Automobile (FISA) insisting on a date change which was not acceptable to the race organisers. Approval was ultimately given for the race to go ahead on its original date but as a Formula Libre race rather than as a round of the Formula One World Championship. The downgraded race was supported by the Formula One Constructors Association (FOCA) aligned teams but not by Ferrari, Ligier, Osella, Renault, or Alfa Romeo, whose allegiances lay with FISA. This race was run with the cars running in 1980-specification trim, with the ground-effect wing cars of the time, equipped with sliding skirts that increased their downforce by ensuring the air under the car did not escape from under the car, where the most important airflow was.

In qualifying, it was once again a major battle between the major players of 1980. The Brabham of Nelson Piquet battled the two Williams cars of Alan Jones and Carlos Reutemann for pole position. Piquet took pole, with Reutemann in second. Reutemann had a close call when in the closing minutes of the session, his Williams spun off and went into the catch fencing. The fencing had wrapped around his windpipe and had begun to strangle Reutemann, and the hapless Argentine was unable to remove the catchfencing on his own. It was only the quick mobilisation of the marshals that were able to rescue Reutemann from what could have quite easily have been his death. Following Reutemann was Jones, Keke Rosberg in the Fittipaldi, Elio de Angelis (Lotus), Riccardo Patrese (Arrows), Ricardo Zunino (Brabham), Nigel Mansell (Lotus) and Andrea de Cesaris (McLaren).

The race was held in quite wet conditions, however the rain had abated shortly before the start of the grand prix. Notably it was only Carlos Reutemann from second on the grid and Keke Rosberg in fourth on the grid who went for slicks, everyone else was on wet weather tyres. Unsurprisingly, Reutemann and Rosberg made poor starts in the still wet conditions. Piquet maintained his lead as Reutemann dropped behind Elio de Angelis and the fast starting Jan Lammers who had come up from tenth on the grid. Lammers was running well behind De Angelis before on the second lap, he went for the overtake. Lammers lost control in the wet conditions and tapped the rear of De Angelis where he spun wide into the gravel trap. He dropped right down to the back of the field where he would go on to retire later in the race with brake fade. Nigel Mansell had made a storming start, moving into fourth place with John Watson right behind him. The reigning champion Alan Jones had dropped down to sixth after a poor start to the race. Derek Daly had also done well to climb up to seventh, on March's return to F1. On lap 4, both Mansell and Watson moved ahead of Reutemann. A three-way battle for second place then followed with De Angelis, Mansell and Watson. Lap five saw Watson move ahead of Mansell, the following lap he moved ahead of the other Lotus of De Angelis. Alan Jones then began a comeback drive, moving ahead of Reutemann and Mansell. On lap 11, Geoff Lees spun off the circuit in his Theodore, Lees unluckily went through the catchfencing and was hit on the head by one of the catchfencing poles. Lees had to be lifted out of the car by the marshalls as he had been briefly knocked unconscious by the pole. The track had then began to dry, Alan Jones was the first driver to come into slicks with Nigel Mansell following suit, despite having spun on the previous lap. Jones having aquaplaned off the circuit on his out-lap damaged the rear of his car. Jones returned to the pits as his mechanics were forced to repair his rear wing. Jones would later retire with a loose skirt. By this time, only Piquet and Watson were the only front runners not to have pitted. Piquet pitted for new tyres allowing Watson to take the lead of the race. Watson then followed Piquet into the pits the following lap. Reutemann now inherited the lead, enjoying a comfortable lead, his gamble of racing with dry tyres since the start of the race had paid off. Female racer Desiré Wilson retired on lap 51 when she spun her Tyrrell off the circuit. Reutemann took a comfortable win, 20 seconds ahead of Piquet ahead of de Angelis, Rosberg and John Watson in a McLaren.

Race 1: United States West
The first of two rounds in the United States of America started a trilogy of F1 races in the Americas on March 15 at the Long Beach street circuit in southern California, just outside the sprawling metropolis of Los Angeles. Goodyear had decided to withdraw from F1 and so everyone was on Michelin tires, and the cars were now running in new 1981-specification cars, with the sliding skirts now banned and cars required to have a 6 cm ground clearance, in order to reduce downforce. Qualifying resulted in something of a surprise with Patrese on pole in the Arrows with Jones and Reutemann behind him. Piquet was fourth with Villeneuve fifth, home favorite Andretti sixth and Mansell seventh. The top 10 was completed by Cheever, Giacomelli (Alfa Romeo) and Jarier. The circuit had been slightly modified with the second left hander on Pine Avenue made one fluid corner instead of two apexes.

Raceday had typically perfect Long Beach weather, and at the start Villeneuve made an amazing start and charged down to Queen's Hairpin, the first corner so quickly that he overshot and so Patrese went into the lead with Jones and Reutemann chasing. In the middle of the pack Prost and de Cesaris collided and both went out. Pironi made a remarkable start to go from 11th on the grid to fourth, ahead of Piquet, the recovering Villeneuve, Cheever and Andretti. On the second lap Reutemann overtook Jones for second but otherwise the top six remained unchanged until lap 17 when Pironi was able to pass Piquet for fourth but on the next lap Villeneuve's Ferrari stopped with a driveshaft failure and so Cheever moved to sixth place. On lap 25 Patrese began to suffer from fuel pressure problems and lost the lead to Reutemann. Patrese soon headed for the pits and so everyone moved up a place and Andretti took over sixth place. As Jones closed up on Reutemann, the Argentine driver made a mistake on Pine Avenue as he lapped Surer and went wide. Jones went ahead. On the same lap Laffite overtook Andretti for sixth place and chased after Cheever. The two cars collided on lap 41 on Ocean Boulevard and Laffite ended up in the pits. As Cheever began to drop back, Andretti was able to climb to fifth place and on lap 54 that became fourth when Pironi slowed with an oil leak.

Jones thus led another Williams 1–2 with Piquet third, Andretti fourth, Cheever fifth and Tambay sixth in the Theodore.

Race 2: Brazil
The Formula One circus moved from North to South America to start a two-stop tour there. The first round was at the Jacarepagua Autodrome in Rio de Janeiro – only the second time F1 had been there. F1 had previously visited the 5-mile Interlagos circuit in São Paulo in 1972–1980; this circuit was effectively dropped after 1980 because of safety issues with the circuit and the growing slums around the circuit being at odds with Formula One's glamorous image. Tyrrell rented its second car to Zunino but otherwise the field was exactly the same, although the new carbon-fibre McLaren MP4/1 which had been seen in Long Beach was not taken to South America. Jean-Pierre Jabouille tried to qualify the Talbot Ligier but his legs were clearly not well enough healed from his accident in Montreal 6 months earlier and so the car was handed over to Jean-Pierre Jarier again. Lotus again ran into trouble with the twin-chassised Lotus 88 and there were murmurs about a new hydro-pneumatic suspension on the Brabhams which enabled the cars to be 6 cm off the ground when they were measured but much closer to the ground when they were out on the track. Pole position went to local hero Piquet in his Brabham with the two Williams cars of Reutemann and Jones behind him. Fourth was Patrese in the impressive Arrows while Prost put his Renault fifth ahead of Bruno Giacomelli's Alfa Romeo, Villeneuve's Ferrari 126CK, the second Renault of Rene Arnoux, Andretti's Alfa Romeo and the Lotus 81B of de Angelis.

It was wet on race morning and at the start took place with the track damp but the rain holding off. Piquet decided to go on slick tires (but everyone else except Didier Pironi and Siegfried Stohr decided to use wets). Prost made a bad start and this caused the fast-starting Villeneuve to have to lift off. Andretti hit the rear of Villeneuve and went over the Ferrari. Behind them Arnoux, Eddie Cheever, Stohr and Chico Serra were all involved. At the front Reutemann went into the lead with Jones, Patrese, Giacomelli, de Angelis and the rest in pursuit. In the early laps de Angelis overtook Giacomelli to take fourth place and when Giacomelli spun off fifth place went to Keke Rosberg's Fittipaldi. John Watson made good progress from a poor grid position and on lap 14 he overtook Rosberg for fourth. The Finn then dropped behind Jean-Pierre Jarier (Talbot Ligier) as well. The order at the front remained unchanged until lap 29 when Jarier went wide and dropped behind Marc Surer (Ensign) and Jacques Laffite (Talbot Ligier). On lap 35 Watson spun as the rain increased and so Surer moved to fifth with Laffite sixth. Surer's remarkable run went on and on lap 49 he overtook de Angelis for fourth place while behind him Jarier repassed Laffite for fifth.

In the closing laps the two Talbot Ligiers switched positions again (Jarier being told to drop back by the team), while Jones waited for Reutemann to move aside as the World Champion was the team's number one. Reutemann did not budge. The team showed pitboards indicating that Reutemann should move over but he did not. Everyone thought he must be waiting for the last lap but Reutemann took the flag first and Jones was furious, and did not take part in the podium ceremony. Patrese finished third with the remarkable Surer fourth ahead of the Talbot Ligiers.

Race 3: Argentina
The other half of the South American tour in Reutemann's home country of Argentina was usually held in January; this time it was in the cooler weather of April. Reutemann's decision to disobey team orders in Brazil had split the Williams team while the Lotus 88 was once again banned and team boss Colin Chapman was so incensed by the decision that he left before practice even began. There was also a dispute over Brabham's new hydro-pneumatic suspension which was designed to overcome the regulation which meant cars had to run with 6 cm of ground clearance. Whenever the Brabham was measured it was 6 cm above the ground. The entry was the same as in Brazil except that Jabouille was back in the Talbot Ligier. He failed to qualify. Also missing out were the two Osellas and Eliseo Salazar's March. Thanks to his hydro-pneumatic suspension system Piquet was on pole position with Alain Prost second quickest in the Renault. Then came Jones and Reutemann, Rene Arnoux in the second Renault and Hector Rebaque in the second Brabham. The top 10 was completed by Gilles Villeneuve (Ferrari), Keke Rosberg (Fittipaldi), Riccardo Patrese (Arrows) and Elio de Angelis in the Lotus.

Raceday came about, and at this varied circuit located in the Argentine capital of Buenos Aires, Jones took the lead at the start but Piquet got ahead in the course of the first lap by driving around the outside of Jones in one of the corners and he then drove away from the field. He ended the race over 25 secs ahead. In the course of the second lap Reutemann overtook Jones and the Australian would later drop behind Prost and Rebaque as well. Rebaque's Brabham was handling well and so he was able to get ahead of the Renault on lap 11 and soon after he got past Reutemann, so for the middle part of the race the Brabhams were running in 1-2 formation. On lap 33, however, the Mexican disappeared with a distributor problem. This put Reutemann back into second place with Prost third and Jones fourth. Arnoux finished fifth while the final point went to de Angelis after a fight with Patrese and Patrick Tambay (Theodore).

Due to internal politics and the drivers' strike at the 1982 South African Grand Prix, the Argentine GP would not return to the calendar until 1995.

Race 4: San Marino (Imola, Italy)
Three weeks later, the GP circus returned to Europe to start the 4 month long tour there. The first race was a new race – a second Italian race called the San Marino Grand Prix at the Autodromo Dino Ferrari near Imola, just outside Bologna and 50 miles west of the tiny principality of San Marino. Team Lotus had decided to miss the race but in England a new Lotus 87 was being tested to replace the banned twin-chassis Lotus 88. The controversy over hydro-pneumatic suspensions had also faded as all the cars now had systems fitted. The big excitement in the paddock was the appearance of the new Toleman F1 team, complete with a Brian Hart turbo engine and Pirelli tires. Neither Brian Henton nor Derek Warwick qualified. Otherwise the entry was little changed although Tyrrell had replaced Ricardo Zunino with a rising star called Michele Alboreto who brought much-needed backing for the team from a local ceramics company. News had emerged on Friday that the United States Grand Prix at Watkins Glen had been cancelled, although this was seen as predictable, given the historic circuit's financial troubles. Qualifying resulted in a popular pole position for Gilles Villeneuve in the turbocharged Ferrari. The Canadian was seven-tenths ahead of Carlos Reutemann's Williams while the Renaults of Rene Arnoux and Alain Prost filled the second row. Nelson Piquet was fifth and Didier Pironi (Ferrari) sixth while the top 10 was completed by John Watson (in the new McLaren MP4/1 - being raced for the first time), Jones, Patrese, and Laffite.

The track was wet at the start and everyone was on wet tires. This race turned out to be an exciting affair as Villeneuve went into the lead while Pironi was able to use the prodigious power of the Ferrari to blast his way up to second position. At the back of the field there was a nasty accident when F1 debutante Miguel Angel Guerra had a moment in Tosa corner and was then hit by Eliseo Salazar's March. This punted the Osella into the barrier at high speed and the Argentine driver had to be cut from the wreck with serious leg injuries. While Guerra was being released from his car the two Ferraris ran away from the rest of the field with Reutemann third, having driven into his teammate Jones to stop the Australian taking third on the first lap. This had damaged Jones's front wing and he was soon in the pits for repairs. That put Patrese up to fourth place and he overtook Reutemann a few laps later the Argentine went off over the grass at the final chicane. Piquet and his Brabham teammate Hector Rebaque completed the top six after Laffite and Arnoux had collided. On lap 14 Villeneuve went into the pits for slicks. As he accelerated away it started to rain again and so two laps later Villeneuve was back in pitlane for wet tires. Pironi led with Patrese second while Piquet moved to third ahead of Reutemann. The Brazilian later got ahead of Patrese as well, and then started to race hard with Pironi. The top five remained unchanged until the 47th lap when Piquet finally overtook Pironi, the Ferrari having damaged a skirt early on. Pironi drifted back behind Patrese, Reutemann and Rebaque but he finished fifth, just ahead of Andrea de Cesaris's McLaren.

Race 5: Belgium
In stark contrast to San Marino, the Belgian Grand Prix at Zolder was a shambolic event filled with tragedies and frustration. Politics dominated this event – Gordon Murray's hydraulic suspension gave his Brabhams considerable performance advantages, and the teams had been heavily protesting the system's legality within the revised rules for the season. 
Also, the political bickering over the Concorde Agreement meant that with 32 entries there were too many cars and pressure was applied to ATS and Theodore to withdraw. ATS withdrew Jan Lammers but ran its second car for Slim Borgudd while Patrick Tambay was left without a drive. The Osella team had Piercarlo Ghinzani driving in place of the injured Miguel Angel Guerra. But the tragedy started with Carlos Reutemann accidentally running over an Osella mechanic, Giovanni Amadeo – who died of a fractured skull the Monday after the race. This accident led to complaints from the drivers about the congestion in the pits.

Qualifying resulted in pole position for Reutemann with Piquet second for Brabham and Pironi third in his turbocharged Ferrari. Fourth place went to Patrese, with the top 10 being completed by Watson, Jones, Villeneuve, Cheever, Laffite, and Mansell.

The race, however, was an appalling embarrassment by top motor racing standards – at the start, there was a drivers' strike concerning mechanic and team personnel safety –  they complained that their views were being ignored, which delayed the start. And when the race started, an Arrows mechanic, Dave Luckett, jumped onto the grid just as the clerk of the course hit the lights to go green in an attempt to start Riccardo Patrese's stalled car. Luckett was run over by the other Arrows driver, Sigfried Stohr – and as Luckett laid sprawled unconscious on the track with broken legs, the marshals were able to get him off the track, and the disorganization continued: as the drivers started their second lap with both Arrows cars still on the narrow start–finish straight, a number of marshals, protesting the clerk's dangerous decision jumped onto the track – mere feet from the cars going at full racing speeds – and attempted to stop the race by waving at the drivers to stop, without the approval of the clerk of the course (who is the ultimate authority on the race's direction). The drivers continued on – because they had not been shown the red flag by the clerk of the course- who is the only person at a Grand Prix who can show this flag. But by the time they were to start a 3rd lap, the marshals succeeded in stopping the field themselves. In the meantime, Luckett was taken to hospital, and survived.

When the race restarted neither Arrows took part. Pironi took the lead with Reutemann, Piquet, Watson and Jones chasing him. The Australian looked very strong in the early laps as he passed Watson and Reutemann and then Jones had a brush with Piquet which left the Brabham in the catchfencing. A furious Piquet charged up to Jones in the pits and attempted to physically fight him. On lap 12 he took the lead from Pironi but eight laps later the Williams jumped out of gear at Bianchibocht and smashed into the barriers. He was fortunate to escape with a scalded thigh caused by water from a demolished radiator. This left Reutemann in the lead from Laffite and Mansell, Pironi having dropped back after going off. Watson was fourth with Villeneuve fifth and de Angelis sixth. It then started to rain, and the race was called off early at 75% distance with Reutemann taking his last victory. The race was In the closing laps Watson faded with gearbox trouble and so Villeneuve finished fourth, de Angelis fifth and Cheever sixth.

Race 6: Monaco
The historic Monaco Grand Prix was the scene of an ultra-exciting race. With too many cars entered there had to be a pre-qualifying session to get the field down to 26 for practice. This eliminated both Tolemans, both Marches and the single ATS of Slim Borgudd. A further six were lost in qualifying with Hector Rebaque (Brabham), Rosberg and Chico Serra (Fittipaldi), Jabouille, and the two Osellas (Piercarlo Ghinzani and Beppe Gabbiani) all going home early. At the front of the grid Piquet was on pole in his Brabham with Villeneuve a remarkable second in this near downforce-absent Ferrari and an impressive Mansell third in the new Lotus 87, which made its first appearance. Then came Reutemann, Patrese, de Angelis, Jones, Laffite, and Alain Prost (Renault). Watson completed the top 10 in the McLaren MP4/1.

At the start there was the usual first corner accident as Andrea de Cesaris (McLaren) tangled with Mario Andretti's Alfa Romeo. Piquet took the lead with Villeneuve chasing and Mansell third ahead of the two Williams cars. The young Englishman disappeared early on with a suspension problem and Reutemann went out with gearbox trouble and Jones moved up ahead of Villeneuve and began to pressure Piquet for the lead. On lap 53 Piquet came up to lap some backmarkers, went offline and slid off into a barrier at Tabac. Jones took the lead and seemed to have the race in his pocket until lap 67 when he went into the pits with a fuel vaporization problem. He was soon on his way again but Villeneuve saw his chance and began to close in. On lap 72 Villeneuve took the lead at Ste Devote. A disappointed Jones finished second with Laffite third, Pironi fourth, Eddie Cheever fifth (despite being two laps down) and Marc Surer sixth in the Ensign.

Race 7: Spain
Three weeks after the Monaco Grand Prix, the narrow and tight Jarama circuit just outside Madrid was the location for the Spanish Grand Prix, and it produced one of the best races of the year. The field had altered somewhat with Eliseo Salazar having left March to join Ensign, displacing Marc Surer. Laffite took pole in his Ligier-Matra with the two Williams-DFVs of Jones and Reutemann second and third ahead of Watson, Prost, and the Alfa of Bruno Giacomelli. Villeneuve was seventh.

Race day was incredibly hot, and the temperature was around 100-degrees when the race began with Jones and Reutemann blasting into the lead as Laffite made a poor start and Villeneuve diving into third place at the first corner, snagging Prost's front wing as he took the place. At the end of the first lap Villeneuve pulled out of Reutemann's slipstream and took second place. Jones quickly built a lead but on lap 14 - when he was around 10secs ahead - he went off at Nuvolari. This left Villeneuve in the lead with Reutemann on his tail. Behind them Watson, Laffite and Elio de Angelis emerged from the hurly-burly and all began to close on the dueling leaders. Reutemann was having some trouble with his gearbox and when Laffite arrived behind him there was little Reutemann could do to stop Jacques overtaking. The Argentine would later drop behind Watson as well as the five front-runners became a train of cars, nose-to-tail for the 18 laps of the race. Villeneuve had the power to get away from his rivals on the straight but in the corners they were all over him. Time and time again Laffite pulled alongside as they emerged from a corner but the Ferrari would surge ahead as the horsepower kicked in. The five remained locked together right to the flag, crossing the line covered by just 1.24s to record the second closest race in the history of F1 at the time. Villeneuve, in a powerful but very ill-handling Ferrari, managed to keep 4 better-handling cars behind him in a car that was badly suited to the slow, narrow and twisty Jarama circuit. Villeneuve, Jacques Laffite, John Watson, Reutemann and Elio de Angelis were all separated by 1.2 seconds at the finish.

The small crowd, the inappropriate time of year this race was held in and the waning interest of the organizers caused this race to be the last Spanish Grand Prix until 1986, when it was moved south to the new Jerez circuit near Seville.

Race 8: France
Two weeks after Gilles Villeneuve's extraordinary victory in Spain, the alternating French Grand Prix moved from the Paul Ricard circuit near Marseille to the fast, sweeping Prenois circuit near Dijon, located in the Burgundy countryside where the F1 gathered with Carlos Reutemann well ahead of Nelson Piquet in the World Championship.

Marc Surer (displaced from Ensign by Eliseo Salazar) had taken over the Theodore drive, leaving Patrick Tambay out of work. However Jabouille had decided to retire as he was no longer competitive as a result of the leg injuries he had suffered in Canada in 1980 and so Tambay became the second Talbot Ligier driver. This was perfect as it reduced the field to 30 cars and meant that there was no need for pre-qualifying. The other news was that Goodyear had returned to F1 and so Williams and Brabham appeared on Goodyear tires. Ensign and March used Avon. Qualifying resulted in pole position for Arnoux's Renault. This was not a surprise but second place for Watson's McLaren MP4/1 was rather startling, particularly as the Marlboro car was ahead of the second Renault driven by Prost. Fourth place went to Piquet with Andrea de Cesaris (McLaren), Laffite, Reutemann, de Angelis, Jones and Mario Andretti (Alfa Romeo) completing the top 10.

On the first lap Piquet took the lead from Watson, Prost, de Cesaris and Villeneuve (who had been 11th on the grid in his Ferrari) while Arnoux dropped back to ninth. Prost soon moved ahead of Watson while further back de Cesaris was pushed behind Villeneuve, although both men were then overtaken by Reutemann. Arnoux recovered to run fifth and he moved up to fourth ahead of Reutemann on lap 33 only to run into trouble and drop back behind the Argentine driver.

On lap 58 there was a torrential downpour and the race was stopped. The weather cleared up quickly and so it was decided that the second part of the race would be run with the grid based on the finishing order of the first part. This time Piquet was engulfed by Prost's Renault and he was followed ahead by Watson and Arnoux. Piquet faded quickly behind Pironi and any advantage he had had in the first part of the race disappeared. Prost stayed ahead all the way to the flag to win his first F1 victory and he was followed home by Watson. Piquet was given third place (although he was fifth on the road) while the remaining points went to Arnoux, Pironi and de Angelis. Prost, who was to become one of the greatest drivers in Formula One history, had won his first of 51 championship Grands Prix at home in a Renault.

Race 9: Britain
The British Grand Prix was held at the flat Silverstone circuit this year, which was the fastest Grand Prix circuit in the world at the time. The field was almost the same as at Dijon two weeks earlier except that Jean-Pierre Jarier had been hired to drive for Osella in place of Miguel Angel Guerra. Team Lotus appeared with the Lotus 88B but once again the team ran into trouble with the FISA over the legality of the car and eventually the cars were disqualified and as they had been built by cannibalizing the 87s the team had no choice but to withdraw. Qualifying resulted in a 1-2 for the Renaults of Arnoux and Prost with Nelson Piquet third in his Brabham. The Brazilian used a new BMW turbo-engined BT50 in the course of practice but set his time in the old BT49C. Pironi was fourth fastest for Ferrari and then came the two McLarens of Watson and de Cesaris. The fourth row featured Jones  alongside Villeneuve's Ferrari while the top 10 was completed by Reutemann (Williams) and Patrese (Arrows).

Raceday was on a Saturday, and at the start Prost walked away from the field. At the start of lap 5, near the Woodcote chicane, Villeneuve lost control, taking out Alan Jones (Williams) and Andrea de Cesaris (McLaren) who were both unable to avoid the Canadian, while Briton John Watson, in the other McLaren, narrowly missed the wreckage. Villeneuve managed to get the Ferrari going again but only got as far as Stowe Corner before parking. On lap 12, Nelson Piquet, who was 3rd at that point, crashed his Brabham at Becketts and had to be carried by an ambulance due to leg injuries. Later in the race, Prost was forced to pit due to problems with an engine plug that could not be replaced without dismantling much of the car, forcing the Frenchman to retire and leaving his teammate, Arnoux, in the lead. Watson was now fighting back, and after being delayed by the Villeneuve-Jones incident he overtook Reutemann and Andretti, and closed on Pironi. As he overtook the Ferrari it blew up and went out and so Watson was a safe third with only the two Renault drivers ahead. On the 17th lap Prost's engine blew but Arnoux remained firmly ahead with Watson second, Reutemann third, Andretti fourth, Patrese fifth and Hector Rebaque (Brabham) sixth. Patrese soon moved ahead of Andretti while Rebaque dropped down the order when he stopped for new tires, Laffite moving into sixth place. The order was then settled until the 50th lap when the Renault engine began to sound odd and Watson began to close up quickly. On the 60th lap he went ahead. At the same moment Andretti disappeared with a throttle cable failure and as Arnoux faded through the field Patrese went out with an engine failure. This meant that the final order was Watson taking victory, with Reutemann, Laffite, Eddie Cheever (Tyrrell), Rebaque and Slim Borgudd (ATS) rounding out the points.

Race 10: Germany
The German Grand Prix at the very fast, straight dominated Hockenheimring saw the field being unchanged apart from the fact that Team Lotus was back in action with a pair of Lotus 87s both sporting new JPS sponsorship. There were some changes of tires with Tyrrell running on Avons, Lotus on Goodyear and Arrows on Pirellis. It was no surprise to see the two Renault turbo cars on the front row with Prost nearly half a second quicker than Arnoux. World Championship leader Reutemann was third with his Williams teammate Jones fourth. Pironi was fifth in his Ferrari, and Piquet was sixth in his Brabham (apparently without any problems from his Silverstone accident), while the top 10 was completed by Laffite, Villeneuve, and the two McLarens of Watson and de Cesaris.

The race turned out to be a classic, and at the start Prost took the lead but Reutemann managed to get ahead of Arnoux. On the run down to the first chicane Pironi also went past Arnoux and Piquet tried the same at the Ostkurve. The Renault and the Brabham touched. This meant that Arnoux had to pit at the end of the lap with a deflated right rear. While this was going on Jones went past Piquet. Halfway around the second lap Pironi disappeared with a blown engine and so Prost led Reutemann, Jones, Piquet, Laffite, Villeneuve and Patrick Tambay (Talbot Ligier). Villeneuve soon dropped away but Jones was in combative form and was challenging Prost for the lead in a superb battle. Behind them Piquet had overtaken Reutemann and was closing up and the fight for the lead was soon between the three cars. But Piquet's tires, improperly worn from his Brabham suffering bodywork damage could not take the pace and he dropped back behind Reutemann.On lap 21 Jones finally managed to get ahead of Prost in the stadium when they were lapping Arnoux. Behind the top five Rebaque had moved into sixth but this became fifth when Reutemann stopped on lap 28 with an engine failure. At two-thirds distance rain began to fall and as the Renault became more difficult to control Piquet was able to take second from Prost and then Jones's car began to misfire and soon Piquet and Prost were both ahead. Jones headed for the pits. Piquet thus inherited victory with Prost second, Laffite third and Rebaque fourth. Eddie Cheever was fifth with Watson sixth.

Race 11: Austria
When F1 descended upon the fast and sweeping Österreichring, the entry was as normal except that the Fittipaldi team, which was struggling for money, was not present because it did not have enough engines. Tyrrell had switched from Avon tyres to Goodyear. The result of this was that Eddie Cheever failed to make the grid in the new Tyrrell 011. With Austria's extra altitude the turbocharged cars were at an advantage, so Arnoux and Prost put their Renaults on the front row with Villeneuve's Ferrari third. Laffite was next up in the Talbot Ligier (powered by a Matra V12 engine) while Williams teammates Carlos Reutemann and Alan Jones were fifth and sixth. The top 10 was completed by Nelson Piquet, Didier Pironi, Elio de Angelis, and Riccardo Patrese.

At the start Villeneuve blasted his Ferrari into the lead ahead of Prost, Arnoux and Pironi (who had made a fast start in his Ferrari). Villeneuve pushed too hard on the second lap and went off at the chicane, rejoining in sixth place. This left Prost and Arnoux to pull away while Pironi's Ferrari provided a road block for those chasing. The cork stayed in the bottle until the ninth lap, by which time 7 cars were stuck behind this car, the Renaults had a lead of nearly 20 seconds. Pironi's Ferrari was quicker in the straights but the car's severe lack of downforce compared to the others meant it was noticeably slower through the Österreichring's high-speed sweepers. Villeneuve crashed heavily at the Bosch Kurve and Laffite made it through with a very brave pass at the first Panorama curve and he was followed by Piquet. Laffite began to close up but then the gap stabilized. Pironi dropped back behind the two Williams cars, Jones still leading Reutemann. By mid-distance Laffite was within striking distance of the Renaults and then Prost suffered a suspension failure and went out, allowing Arnoux to take the lead. On lap 39 Laffite finally managed to get ahead as the pair diced through traffic. Arnoux had to settle for second while third went to Piquet. Jones and Reutemann were fourth and fifth and the final point went to John Watson (McLaren).

Race 12: Holland
The Fittipaldi team was back in action for the Dutch GP at the Zandvoort circuit near Amsterdam after missing the Austrian GP but had switched to Pirelli tires. Otherwise the field was the same as usual and it was an all-Renault front row with Alain Prost outqualifying Rene Arnoux. Third place went to World Championship challenger Piquet with his rival Reutemann fifth, behind his Williams teammate Jones. Laffite was sixth in his Talbot Ligier just ahead of Andretti, Watson, de Angelis, and Patrese. Andrea de Cesaris qualified 13th but was withdrawn because the team was worried that he would damage another car, his season with the team having seen a string of accidents. The Italian De Cesaris, although quick was horrendously erratic- he ended up crashing no less than 19 times this season, including 8 times during a race- and even more remarkably without injuring himself once.

At the start Prost and Arnoux went into Tarzan ahead but behind them Gilles Villeneuve tried to make up for his poor qualifying and charge through a gap between Patrese and Bruno Giacomelli's Alfa Romeo. Giacomelli was unaware that Villeneuve was there and the result was that Villeneuve ran into the Alfa, vaulted over it and landed, spinning. At the next corner Andretti and Reutemann collided and the American ended up with a bent front wing. Also in trouble were Pironi and Tambay, the pair having collided in the course of the first lap. This left Prost leading Arnoux and Jones with Piquet fourth, Laffite fifth and Reutemann sixth. In the opening laps Jones went ahead of Arnoux and the Frenchman soon dropped behind Piquet and Laffite as well By the 10th lap Reutemann too was clear of Arnoux and a couple of laps later Watson drove around the outside of Arnoux at Tarzan to take sixth place. The order at the front remained unchanged but Jones was beginning to challenge Prost. behind these two there was another lively battle for fourth between Laffite and Reutemann. This ended on lap 18 with the pair colliding. Jones tried to pass Prost on several occasions but then his tires became marginal and he dropped away. In the closing laps he fell into the clutches of Piquet and lost second place. Hector Rebaque gave Brabham fourth place after a steady run with the other points going to de Angelis and Eliseo Salazar in the Ensign, one of the few men still running, albeit two laps down. Piquet's second place meant that he was equal on points with Reutemann.

Race 13: Italy
The second Italian and last European race of the year, the Italian Grand Prix, returned to the historic Monza circuit just outside Milan after a year's stay at Imola. Nelson Piquet and Carlos Reutemann arrived on equal points in the World Championship, and the summer had been seen the emergence as a major force of Alain Prost in the Renault and he too was becoming the threat to the World Championship leaders. The switching around of tires continued with Tyrrell deciding to go back to Goodyear at least for Eddie Cheever's car. The field was the same as usual with Arnoux on pole in the Renault ahead of Reutemann's Williams and Prost. Laffite was fourth in his Ligier and he was clear of Jones, who had arrived in Italy after being physically beaten up by 5 men in London; and Piquet while the top 10 was completed by Watson, Pironi and Villeneuve in the powerful but evil-handling Ferraris and Giacomelli's Alfa Romeo. The event was significant in that it marked the first start for the Toleman team, Brian Henton having finally qualified one of the Toleman-Hart cars in 23rd position on the grid after a season of disappointment. At the start Pironi made an exceptional start and he was fourth at the first chicane behind Prost, Reutemann and Arnoux. By the time the field arrived on the back straight Pironi was second. It did not last long Arnoux moved to second on the fifth lap and on lap six Laffite went to third (having overtaken Jones, Piquet and Reutemann). Villeneuve followed him but disappeared with turbo failure soon afterwards. Then Laffite began to drop back with a slow puncture and it began to rain. Jacques went off. This left the two Renaults and the two Williams cars ahead but with a gap between them. Arnoux then went off at the Parabolica, swerving to avoid Eddie Cheever's abandoned Tyrrell and so Prost was left on his own.

There was then a huge accident at the Lesmo when Watson lost control of his MP4/1. It spun into the barriers and the engine was ripped from the tub. Watson emerged unhurt but the engine went across the road, causing Michele Alboreto to crash his Tyrrell. The next to arrive was Reutemann and he had to take to the grass and so he dropped behind Giacomelli. The Alfa driver was not in luck however and on lap 26 his Alfa went into the pits with his gearbox jammed. this put Piquet into third place behind Prost and Jones and it looked like staying that way until the last lap when his engine blew, which allowed Reutemann, de Angelis and Pironi to pass him. He picked up just one point and Reutemann moved three points ahead in the World Championship.

Race 14: Canada
The season concluded with two races in North America, the first of these being in Montreal, Canada. Alan Jones announced that he was retiring for Formula 1 and there were rumors that Mario Andretti would do the same. At the same time Niki Lauda was spotted testing one of the new McLaren MP4/1s at Donington Park and it looked like he would be making a comeback. At the same time Siegfried Stohr, after his trauma in Belgium and the uncompetitiveness of the Arrows decided that he no longer wanted to be an F1 driver and a deal was struck for Riccardo Patrese to be partnered in Canada by Gilles Villeneuve's brother Jacques Villeneuve. Qualifying resulted in pole position for Piquet with his title rival Reutemann alongside. Jones was third while Prost was fourth in his Renault.

The weather had turned cold and wet by race day and at the start Jones took the lead after banging wheels with Reutemann. The Argentine driver had to lift off and he was overtaken by rival Piquet, Prost and de Angelis. Further back Villeneuve tipped Arnoux into a spin, the Renault bashing into Pironi's Ferrari as it went off. In the laps that followed Villeneuve moved up to take third on lap 7 when Jones spun and Piquet dropped back as he tried to avoid the Williams. This let Prost take the lead with Laffite second. Watson moved to fourth and things began to settle down until lap 13 when Laffite moved into the lead. He was followed through into second place a few laps later by Villeneuve and as Prost faded further he fell behind Watson as well. Watson was then able to catch and pass Villeneuve as well and that was how the race ended with fourth place going to Bruno Giacomelli (Alfa Romeo), fifth to Piquet and sixth to de Angelis. Piquet's two point mean that he and Reutemann headed to Las Vegas separated by a point while Laffite had an outside chance of winning the title.

Race 15: Caesars Palace (United States)
The Watkins Glen circuit in the state of New York was removed from the calendar in May due to bankruptcy of the company operating the circuit, resulting in a three-week long gap between the Canadian Grand Prix and the new Caesars Palace Grand Prix at a circuit located in a car park outside of the Caesars Palace hotel and casino complex in Las Vegas, Nevada. During this time frame Niki Lauda announced his decision to return to F1 with McLaren in 1982. Many in the F1 paddock were confused and unhappy to be racing around the car park of a Las Vegas casino.

World Championship leader Carlos Reutemann qualified on pole from his teammate Alan Jones. The Australian had no intent to do anything to help the Argentine to the title because of their clash over team orders at the start of the year. He was retiring from F1 after the race and had nothing to lose. He was going for a victory. Third on the grid was Gilles Villeneuve in the Ferrari with Reutemann's title rival Nelson Piquet fourth, Alain Prost fifth in his Renault and John Watson sixth in the McLaren.

In dry,  conditions, Jones took the lead at the start with Reutemann dropping behind Villeneuve, Prost and Giacomelli before the first corner, while Piquet was eighth. With Villeneuve holding up those behind, Jones drove to an unchallenged victory. Prost overtook Villeneuve on lap three but his Renault was not as fast as Jones' Williams. On the next lap Laffite overtook Watson and the order then stabilized with Piquet running behind Reutemann, both men out of the points. On lap 17 Piquet passed the subdued Reutemann and he was followed by Andretti. Piquet chased after Watson and took sixth place on lap 22. This was briefly fifth when Villeneuve stopped with a fuel injection problem. But Nelson was then overtaken by Andretti. A few moments later Giacomelli's promising run in fourth place ended when he went off and rejoined back in ninth position so Piquet was back in fifth but when Reutemann overtook Watson for sixth the pair were back on equal points (although Piquet would win the title on victories). Then Andretti retired with a broken rear suspension and Piquet moved to fourth and Reutemann to fifth. Soon afterwards Prost pitted for tires and dropped to sixth but at the same time Mansell went ahead of Reutemann and as Prost recovered so the Argentine lost another place. Prost's recovery would take him to second place, while Reutemann's unimpressive afternoon continued as he drifted behind the recovering Giacomelli. Piquet got up to third when Laffite went in for tires but he was then overtaken by Mansell and Giacomelli, the Italian moving up to third in the closing laps. So Jones won, ahead of Prost, Giacomelli, Mansell, Piquet and Laffite.

With Reutemann out of the points, Piquet's fifth place was enough to win his first of 3 World Championship titles.

Results and standings

Grands Prix

Scoring system

Championship points were awarded on a 9–6–4–3–2–1 basis to the top six finishers in each race.

World Drivers' Championship standings

World Constructors' Championship standings

Non-championship race
A single non-championship Formula One race was also held in 1981. It was technically a Formula Libre race, since the cars did not conform to the current Formula One regulations. Although not a part of the World Championship, the 1981 South African Grand Prix attracted high-calibre drivers and cars and was won by Carlos Reutemann in a Williams.

Notes

References

External links
 1981 F1 review

Formula One seasons